Peep Lassmann (born 19 March 1948 in Tartu) is an Estonian pianist trained at the Moscow Conservatory under Emil Gilels who has served as the rector of the Estonian Academy of Music and Theatre since 1992. He has performed the Estonian premieres of Olivier Messiaen's Vingt regards sur l'enfant-Jésus and Catalogue d'oiseaux.

References

Estonian classical pianists
1948 births
Living people
Tallinn Music High School alumni
Academic staff of the Estonian Academy of Music and Theatre
Estonian Academy of Music and Theatre alumni
People from Tartu
20th-century Estonian musicians
21st-century Estonian musicians
21st-century classical pianists
Recipients of the Order of the White Star, 4th Class
Recipients of the Order of the National Coat of Arms, 3rd Class